The 1934–35 Scottish Division One season was won by Rangers by three points over city rival Celtic. St Mirren and Falkirk finished 19th and 20th respectively and were relegated to the 1935–36 Scottish Division Two.

League table

Results

References 

 Statto.com

1934–35 Scottish Football League
Scottish Division One seasons
Scot